Edith Konecky (August 1, 1922 – March 28, 2019) was a Jewish American feminist novelist.

Early life and education 
Konecky was born Edith Rubin on August 1, 1922, in Brooklyn, New York, the daughter of Harry and Elizabeth Smith Rubin. Konecky has an older brother, Martin. Harry's father had escaped the pogroms in Eastern Europe, immigrating to the United States, where he became a prosperous dress manufacturer. Elizabeth's mother, Ida Berlin, ran away from her family in Kiev at a very young age because she was promised to be married to someone she did not like, ending up in New York.  She was, perhaps, the most important influence on Edith as she was growing up.  Elizabeth's father, Max Shmitoff, later changed to Smith at Ellis Island, was said to have pulled a Cossack off his horse during a pogrom at their Jewish village near Minsk, in Belarus, killing him with his own sword.

Her writing "career," began in high school when she won her first writing prize. At age 17, Konecky enrolled at New York University for two years, from 1939 to 1941, leaving before graduation. She returned to school at age 37, in 1961, graduating from Columbia University.

Career  
Even as she entered into her life as a suburban mother in the 1950s, Konecky did not stop writing, using her daily experiences as fodder for her short stories.

One year after graduating from Columbia University, Konecky received a Yaddo fellowship. She continued to win fellowships to Yaddo throughout the late 1960s and late 1970s.

During the 1960s and into the 1970s, Konecky published several short stories and then in 1976, her widely acclaimed first novel, Allegra Maud Goldman. Konecky began writing Allegra while at the MacDowell colony in 1962.

The image of her father — a distant, driven character — featured prominently in both Allegra and Konecky's later novel, A Place at the Table. Allegra is a coming-of-age work that chronicles the growth of a young female artist. In brilliantly comic, deceptively simple vignettes, Konecky depicts the world of a nouveau riche Jewish American family in the early part of the 20th century. In her later novel, A Place at the Table (1989 & 2000), Konecky explores similar territory through the eyes of an older, more experienced heroine, Rachel. This novel also deals with Konecky's sexuality. A Place at the Table was a finalist for the 1990 Stonewall Book Award.

Konecky's more recent works are a collection of short stories, Past Sorrows and Coming Attractions (2002) and a novel, View to the North (2004).

Personal life 
In 1944, Edith Rubin married Murray L. Konecky and together they had two children, Michael and Joshua. Konecky and her husband divorced in 1963 and by the time Allegra appeared, Konecky came out as a lesbian.

Awards and honors 

 New York Foundation of the Arts fellowship, 1992
 Wurlitzer Foundation fellowship, 1974

Works 

 Fiction and the Facts of Life (2011) Maplewood, N.J.: Hamilton Stone Editions. 
 Love and Money  (2006) Maplewood, N.J.: Hamilton Stone Editions. 
 View to the North (2004) Maplewood, N.J.: Hamilton Stone Editions. 
 Past Sorrows and Coming Attractions (2000) Maplewood, N.J.: Hamilton Stone Editions. 
 A Place at the Table (1989) New York: Random House. 
 Allegra Maud Goldman (1976) New York: Harper & Row.

References

External links
 Edith Konecky papers at the Sophia Smith Collection, Smith College Special Collections

1922 births
2019 deaths
20th-century American novelists
21st-century American novelists
American women novelists
American women short story writers
American feminist writers
Jewish feminists
People from Brooklyn
Jewish American novelists
20th-century American women writers
21st-century American women writers
20th-century American short story writers
21st-century American short story writers
New York University alumni
Columbia University alumni
21st-century American Jews